Isabelle Danjou (born 14 September 1969) is a French rower. She competed in the women's coxless pair event at the 1992 Summer Olympics.

References

External links
 

1969 births
Living people
French female rowers
Olympic rowers of France
Rowers at the 1992 Summer Olympics
Sportspeople from Dordogne
20th-century French women
21st-century French women